Stadion Hoheluft is a Football stadium in Eppendorf, Hamburg, Germany . It is used as the stadium of SC Victoria Hamburg matches. The capacity of the stadium is 11,000 spectators.  The record attendance for the ground was 37,000 during the final of the British Zone Championship in which Hamburger SV beat FC St. Pauli 6–1. 

For the  inaugural season of the new European League of Football the Hamburg Sea Devils (ELF) plan to play their home games at the stadium.

References

External links
 information
 Pictures of the Stadion Hoheluft

Football venues in Hamburg
Buildings and structures in Hamburg-Nord
European League of Football venues